Ciriaco Ceballos Neto or Ciriaco Cevallos y Bustillo (Quijano, Cantabria, 1763 - México, 1816) was a Spanish sailor, explorer and cartographer. The Zeballos River and Zeballos, British Columbia are named after him.

References

1763 births
1816 deaths
People from the Bay of Santander
Spanish cartographers
Spanish naval officers